Hogadon Basin Ski Area is a ski resort located  south of Casper, Wyoming on Casper Mountain. The mountain features 28 trails of varying difficulty. Of those trails, 20% are beginner, 40% are intermediate and 40% are expert ski terrain. The mountain also features a terrain park. With 600 vertical feet from top to bottom . The ski area offers a restaurant as well. Hogadon is one of the few resorts in the country that has the actual resort building located on the summit as opposed to the base.

The Details:

Elevation: top- 8,000 feet; vertical rise- 600 feet

The Prospector Chair (Double Chair Lift): 2,200 feet long; 1,000 skiers per hour

The Mine Shaft (Magic Carpet Lift):  on beginner terrain

60 acres of groomed slopes

50% snowmaking capacity

Cross country skiing
Along with traditional downhill skiing, the mountain also features several miles of cross country trails, minutes from the actual resort itself. These trails are often lit at night for night skiing. As of 2022 The ski resort offers "night" downhill skiing on 2 runs.

References

5. http://hogadon.net/

Buildings and structures in Natrona County, Wyoming
Ski areas and resorts in Wyoming
Tourist attractions in Natrona County, Wyoming